William Froude (28 November 1810 in Devon – 4 May 1879 in Simonstown, South Africa) was an English engineer, hydrodynamicist and naval architect. He was the first to formulate reliable laws for the resistance that water offers to ships (such as the hull speed equation) and for predicting their stability.

Biography

Froude was born at Dartington, Devon, England, the son of Robert Froude, Archdeacon of Totnes and was educated at Westminster School and Oriel College, Oxford, graduating with a first in mathematics in 1832.

His first employment was as a surveyor on the South Eastern Railway which, in 1837, led to Brunel giving him responsibility for the construction of a section of the Bristol and Exeter Railway. It was here that he developed his empirical method of setting out track transition curves and introduced an alternative design to the helicoidal skew arch bridge at Rewe and Cowley Bridge Junction, near Exeter. During this period he lived in Cullompton and was Vicar's Warden at St Andrew's Church from 1842 to 1844. He organised, and paid a large amount to the rebuilding of the chancel and other restoration work. He also offered to pay to restore the nave if local people would pay 10% of the cost but this offer was refused. On completion of the Bristol to Exeter line in 1844 he left the town.

At Brunel's invitation Froude turned his attention to the stability of ships in a seaway and his 1861 paper to the Institution of Naval Architects became influential in ship design. This led to a commission to identify the most efficient hull shape, which he was able to fulfil by reference to scale models: he established a formula (now known as the Froude number) by which the results of small-scale tests could be used to predict the behaviour of full-sized hulls. He built a sequence of 3, 6 and (shown in the picture) 12 foot scale models and used them in towing trials to establish resistance and scaling laws.

His experiments were vindicated in full-scale trials conducted by the Admiralty and as a result the first ship test tank was built, at public expense, at his home in Torquay.  Here he was able to combine mathematical expertise with practical experimentation to such good effect that his methods are still followed today.

Froude also tested the "wave-line" theory of John Scott Russell. The model Raven had sharp lines in accordance with Scott Russell's theory. The Swan had fuller lines with blunt ends. Raven had less resistance at low speeds of the two, but Swan had less resistance at higher speeds. This showed that the "wave-line" theory was not as universal as claimed, and was the start of a better understanding of hull resistance.

In 1877, he was commissioned by the Admiralty to produce a machine capable of absorbing and measuring the power of large naval engines. He invented and built the world's first water brake dynamometer, sometimes known as the hydraulic dynamometer, which led to the formation of Heenan & Froude Ltd in Birmingham.

While on holiday as an official guest of the Royal Navy he died in Simonstown, South Africa, where he was buried with full naval honours.

He was the brother of James Anthony Froude, a historian, and Hurrell Froude, writer and priest. William was married to Catherine Henrietta Elizabeth Holdsworth, daughter of the Governor of Dartmouth Castle, mercantile magnate and member of Parliament Arthur Howe Holdsworth.

Works

See also
 Antiroll tanks
 Blade element theory
 Froude's law of similitude
 Froude number
 Froude efficiency
 Froude's experiments
 Froude–Krylov force
 Propeller theory
 Track transition curve
 Water brake-type absorber

References

External links 

 
 Biography of William Froude
 "Froude, William." Encyclopædia Britannica. 2007. Encyclopædia Britannica Online. 29 April 2007.
 Second Torquay honour for Naval architect William Froude. Herald Express, 26 December 2013.

1810 births
1879 deaths
Alumni of Oriel College, Oxford
British expatriates in South Africa
Engineers from Devon
Fellows of the Royal Society
Fluid dynamicists
British naval architects
People educated at Westminster School, London
People from South Hams (district)
Royal Medal winners
19th-century British businesspeople